Varser is a village in the Sevan Municipality of the Gegharkunik Province of Armenia.

Etymology 
The name Varser is derived from a root word meaning "hair". According to popular folklore, this refers to a girl who drowned in Lake Sevan, after which her long hair spread out across the water. The village was also previously known as Chirchir and Chrchr until 1946.

History 
The village is first mentioned in the 9th century as a gift of Ashot II Bagratuni to an "Apostles' Church". Most of the Armenians in the village are descendants of migrants from Bitlis and Maku in Western Armenia, today located in southeastern Turkey and northwestern Iran, respectively.

Gallery

References

External links 

 
 

Populated places in Gegharkunik Province